Bugarama is a town in western Rwanda.

Location
Bugarama is located in Rusizi District, Western Province, close to the borders with Burundi (to the east) and the Democratic Republic of the Congo (to the west).

Population
The population of Bugarama was about 28,810 as of December 2013.

Points of interest
The following points of interest lie within the town limits or close to the edges of town:
 Offices of Cavicon Consultants, Safkoko, FHI
 The headquarters of Bugarama Sector
 The International border crossing between Rwanda and the Democratic Republic of the Congo at Bugarama City
 The International border crossing between Rwanda and Burundi at Ruhwa
 A branch of Bank of Kigali
 A branch of Banque Populaire du Rwanda
 A branch of Ruyange Sacco 
 Cyamudongo National Forest
 Bugarama Rice Plantation - A project of Rural Development Inter-Diocesan Service
 Bugarama Islamic Health Center 
 Church: Eglise Catholique Saint Paul Muko
 High School: Groupe Scolaire St Paul Muko
 International Market of Bugarama

See also
 Bukavu
 Lake Kivu
 Access Bank Rwanda

External links
 About Bugarama Rice Plantation

References

Rusizi District
Western Province, Rwanda
Populated places in Rwanda